This is a list of Nigerian films scheduled for theatrical release in 2020.

2020

January–March

September 

{| class="wikitable"
! colspan="2" |Opening
! style="width:20%;" |Title
! style="width:10%;" |Director
!Cast
! style="width:13%" |Genre
! style="width:20%" |Notes
!Ref.
|-
| style="text-align:center; background:orange; textcolor:#000;" |SEPT
E

M

B

ER
| rowspan="1" style="text-align:center; background:#d8d8d8; textcolor:#000;" |20
|Soft Work
|Darasen Richards
|Frank Donga

Akin Lewis

Shaffy Bello

Sanni Mu’azu

IK Ogbonna
|Action drama
|
|
|}

October–December

Notes 
Theatrical releases were limited due to the COVID-19 pandemic in Nigeria.

See also 

 2020 in Nigeria
 List of Nigerian films

References 

2020
Lists of 2020 films by country or language
Films
2020s in Nigerian cinema